was the ninth shōgun of the Kamakura shogunate of Japan.

He was a son of the eighth shōgun Prince Hisaaki and was a grandson of the Emperor Go-Fukakusa. He was also a puppet ruler controlled by Hōjō Takatoki, who was the Kamakura shogunate's shikken or chief minister. His mother was daughter of Prince Koreyasu who died in 1306.

After the collapse of the Kamakura bakufu, he became a Buddhist priest. He died shortly afterwards.

The Kamakura shogunate was succeeded by the Kenmu Restoration.

Eras of Morikuni's bakufu
The years in which Morikuni was shōgun are more specifically identified by more than one era name or nengō.

Pre-Nanboku-chō court
 Enkyō (1308–1311)
 Ōchō (1311–1312)
 Shōwa (1312–1317)
 Bunpō (1317–1319)
 Gen'ō (1319–1321)
 Genkō (1321–1324)
 Shōchū (1324–1326)
 Karyaku(1326–1329)
 Gentoku (1329–1331)
 Genkō (1331–1334)

Nanboku-chō southern court
Eras as reckoned by legitimate Court (as determined by Meiji rescript)

Nanboku-chō northern Court
Eras as reckoned by pretender Court (as determined by Meiji rescript)
 Shōkei (1332–1338)

Notes

References
 Nussbaum, Louis-Frédéric and Käthe Roth. (2005).  Japan encyclopedia. Cambridge: Harvard University Press. ;  OCLC 58053128
 Titsingh, Isaac. (1834). Nihon Ōdai Ichiran; ou,  Annales des empereurs du Japon. Paris: Royal Asiatic Society, Oriental Translation Fund of Great Britain and Ireland. OCLC 5850691.

1301 births
1333 deaths
14th-century Japanese people
14th-century shōguns
Japanese princes
Kamakura shōguns
People from Kamakura